Vasudevan Baskaran (born 17 August 1950) is a former field hockey player and coach from Tamil Nadu, India. He captained the India, which won the gold medal at the 1980 Summer Olympics in Moscow, then part of the Soviet Union.

Thereafter he coached and mentored several players for the Indian team. He was the head coach of the India hockey team at the 1998 and 2006 Hockey World Cup. Now he lives with his family in Besant Nagar in Chennai, India.

Career
After the Olympic gold victory, Baskaran had coached India several times, the last time at the 2006 Men's Hockey World Cup in Mönchengladbach. Currently he is the Chief Coach of Bhopal Badshahs in World Series Hockey league.

Awards 
He was awarded the Arjuna Award in (1979–1980) for his performance as a player in Olympic Games.

See also 
 List of Indian hockey captains in Olympics
 Field hockey in India

References

External links
 Bharatiya Hockey
 
 

1950 births
Living people
Indian field hockey coaches
Field hockey players from Chennai
Olympic field hockey players of India
Olympic gold medalists for India
Field hockey players at the 1976 Summer Olympics
Indian male field hockey players
Field hockey players at the 1980 Summer Olympics
Recipients of the Padma Shri in sports
Recipients of the Arjuna Award
Loyola College, Chennai alumni
Olympic medalists in field hockey
Asian Games medalists in field hockey
Field hockey players at the 1974 Asian Games
Field hockey players at the 1978 Asian Games
Medalists at the 1980 Summer Olympics
Asian Games silver medalists for India
Medalists at the 1974 Asian Games
Medalists at the 1978 Asian Games